Gerald Augustus Harold Bedford ( – ) was a British entomologist of the 20th century who specialised in ticks from South Africa.

He first worked at the British Museum of Natural History with F.V. Theobald and then was nominated as entomologist at the Division of Veterinary Services of the University of Pretoria in Onderstepoort on the 20. There, he studied vertebrate parasites (mites, ticks and lice). He started to collect species of ticks for the National Tick Collection in 1912, with nymphs of Aponomma exornatum collected in Onderstepoort. In 1920, he was promoted Research Officer in Onderstepoort. He died in 1938 at the age of 46.

Authored Taxa 
Between 1912 and 1938, Bedford discovered and described the following species of tick in South Africa :

 Argas peringueyi (Bedford & Hewitt, 1925)
 Rhipicephalus theileri (Bedford & Hewitt, 1925)
 Haemaphysalis cooleyi (Bedford, 1929)
 Ixodes elongatus (Bedford, 1929)
 Nuttalliella namaqua (Bedford, 1931)
 Argas striatus (Bedford, 1932)
 Rhipicephalus distinctus (Bedford, 1932)

Publications (incomplete) 
  1925: "Descriptions of two new species of ticks, with notes on rare and hitherto unrecorded species from South Africa". South African Journal of Natural History, 5: 259-266.
  1928: "South African mosquitoes". Rep. Vet. Res. S. Afr., 13 & 14: 883-990.
  1929(Oct): "Anoplura (Siphunculata and Mallophaga) from South African Hosts". 15th Annual Report of the Director of Veterinary Services, Union of South Africa, 15: 501-549.
  1931(Apr): "Nuttalliella namaqua, a new genus and species of tick". Parasitology 23 (2): 230-232. 
  1932: "Description of Argas striatus, a new species of tick". 18th Report of the Director of Veterinary Services and Animal Industry, Union of South Africa, 18: 221-222.
  1932: "A synoptic check-list and host-list of the ectoparasites found on South African Mammalia, Aves and Reptilia (2nd ed.)". 18th Report of the Director of Veterinary Services and Animal Industry, Union of South Africa, 18 (2): 223-523.
  1934: "Investigations into the transmission of blue-tongue in sheep, during the season 1931/1932". Onderstepoort. J. vet. Sci., 2 (2): 509-562. (Rev. appl. Ent. (B), 22; p. 171).

References

See also 
  "Obituary - G.A.H. Bedford". Journal of the Entomological Society of Southern Africa 1939; 1: 149-150.
  "A century of tick taxonomy in South Africa". Onderstepoort Journal of Veterinary Research 2009; 76 (1): 69-74. 

British arachnologists
British entomologists
Academic staff of the University of Pretoria
1891 births
1938 deaths
20th-century British zoologists